William Black (1771 – 18 June 1866) was a Canadian shipper, merchant, and office-holder born in Aberdeen, Scotland.

Black grew up and was educated in Scotland. He immigrated to New Brunswick in 1798 work with his brother John, an established shipping and timber export merchant. By 1808 he was managing their timber trade in Saint John while his brother opened a new office in Halifax, Nova Scotia. In a few years they had the largest business enterprises in British North America. They both married daughters of Christopher Billopp, a leading an influential businessman and member of the Legislative Council of New Brunswick.

Black was appointed to the Council in 1817 by George Stracey Smyth, the Lieutenant Governor. He eventually achieved the position of president of the council.

During his time as acting governor of the colony of New Brunswick in 1829 to 1831, they had named the small village of Blackville after him.

References 

 

1771 births
1866 deaths
Canadian businesspeople in shipping
Canadian merchants
People from Aberdeen
Members of the Legislative Council of New Brunswick
Colony of New Brunswick people
Scottish emigrants to pre-Confederation New Brunswick
Businesspeople in timber
19th-century Canadian businesspeople